The claviorgan (also known as the claviorganum, claviorgano, clavecin organisee) is a combination of a stringed instrument (usually a keyboard instrument)  and an organ. Its origin is uncertain but its history can be traced back to the fifteenth century.

According to one account, the instrument was invented by the Moorish instrument maker Mahoma Mofferiz, with his earliest known example documented in 1479. Other "Clabiorganos" or "claui organos" are documented in Spain by the year 1500, and the instrument seems to have spread from there. A number of "virgynalls with regals" are mentioned in the inventories of Henry VIII in 1542/3 and 1547 and Wilson Barry  cites references to the claviorganum in England dating back to the 1530s. The term claviorgan in its strictest sense refers to the combination of a harpsichord (or other harpsichord type instrument) and an organ, although later could also be used to refer to a combination of a piano and organ. Michael Praetorius describes the claviorgan in his Syntagma Musicum of 1619 as:
a clavicymbal, or some other symphony, in which a number of pipes is combined with the strings. Externally it looks exactly like a clavicymbal or symphony, apart from the bellows, which are sometimes set at the rear and sometimes placed inside the body

Description

The spinet-regals are usually quite compact, especially compared to their larger harpsichord cousins. The spinet is often of the smaller Italian style in a square case, as opposed to the perhaps more familiar Bentside shape popular in Britain. The organ is usually a small regal, with the bellows perpendicular to the keyboard, and pipes with tiny resonators.

The instrument seems to have been very popular in Britain in the eighteenth century: both the larger harpsichord-organ combinations, and the organised-square pianos. Indeed, there are more than 20 surviving examples built in the UK (mostly in London) of which the large portion date between 1700 and 1800.

The most complete British organised-harpsichord is that constructed for the Earl of Wemyss. The harpsichord is typical of the early and ornate work of Jacob Kirckman, with an organ case that matches the marquetry and elaborate figured veneer of the harpsichord. The harpsichord stop levers are laid out in the conventional fashion on either side of the name-board, with the organ stops being placed at either side of the keyboards with a coupling mechanism to the organ at the front of the harpsichord.

The organ case is also fitted with four foot-levers; three at the front of the organ and one at the side of the case. Two of these are for operating the bellows (one main and one auxiliary), the third shuts off the sliders of the two metal ranks achieving a woody sound, and the final lever operated a kind of swell mechanism opening a sprung panel in the side of the instrument. This allows for quite a lot of variation in timbre between the organ and the harpsichord.

How typical the arrangement is of instruments across Europe and the ages is difficult to quantify, as little is still known about this instrument.

Early history

Claviorgans were mentioned in the inventories of several early 16th-century members of the Spanish royal family, including inventories from Granada in the year 1500. Other early references to claviorgans are to be found in an inventory of the possessions of Henry VIII taken in 1547 which includes four instruments being combinations of "virgynalles" and "regals". In this early terminology "virgynall" does not refer to a specific instrument but to any plucked string keyboard.

In 1590 Philip III of Spain was given a claviorgan by a German monarch, which also appears in a 1602 inventory of the court instruments. Other royal instruments include a Willenbrock claviorgan made for Prince Georg of Hanover, and a number of instruments which appear to have been made for Frederick Prince of Wales and now in the Royal Collection.

It was primarily used by the aristocracy since the claviorgan was considerably more expensive than any other keyboard instrument barring a full-sized church organ. One English instrument which has been in the possession of the Earl of Wemyss since its purchase in the middle of the eighteenth century still retains the receipts for the organ part alone recording two payments to "John Snetzler, Organ Builder" totalling £86.

Show instrument 
There are a couple of known claviorgans that were ‘show’ instruments. One surviving example is an automatic claviorgan by Matteus Rungell which is now in a museum in Dresden combining an organ and a spinet.

However, a more famous example is the ‘Galleria armonico’ assembled by Michelle Todini in Rome in the seventeenth century, and which ended its days in the palace of the Verospi marquises, now the Palazzo del Credito Italiano. This consisted of two rooms, one of which contained seven keyboard instruments all of which were said to be controlled from the keyboard of a harpsichord. This included an organ, three types of spinets, a violin, and another bowed string instrument. There are also several illustrations of the instrument, although it is not known how accurate any of them are. The harpsichord and its accompanying statues may now be found in the collection of the Metropolitan Museum of Art in New York as well as a clay model surviving from its inception. No part of the composite instrument is known to survive.

Another example of a claviorgan playing stringed instruments is described in a letter from Henry Oldenburg in 1664.

Pedals
The instrument given to Philip III of Spain mentioned briefly above is one of very few surviving claviorgans known to have had pedals. Another earlier instrument from Linz, Austria is also described as having a pedalboard which couples to the keyboard. Little information is available as yet on either instrument, so this leads one to speculate how the pedals would have operated.

With other harpsichord/clavichord type instruments, there are two normal ways of adding pedals; either with pedal pull-downs (usually only in the bass), or with a separate instrument, with a separate soundboard, below the main keyboard. In the latter case the pedal-instruments allowed for a much greater compass than with pull-downs.

However, with an organ chest to account for as well as the harpsichord or clavichord, may also be possible that the organ was operated from the pedal board, leaving the harpsichord/clavichord completely separate, although still allowing the two to be coupled together when desired. This would be similar to having one of the keyboards of a virginal claviorgan completely separate.

This style of instrument is seen in a lid painting of a virginal from 1619, which depicts a claviorgan as part of an ensemble. The continuo player has his right hand on the virginal keyboard and his left playing the organ.

The claviorgan as a remote console

The instrument described by the musician and historian Charles Burney is a more unusual type of claviorgan. Used in Westminster Abbey for one of the Handel commemoration services in 1784; the instrument consisting of a harpsichord at the front of the orchestra which was connected to an organ mounted on a screen behind the performers. Burney describes in brief the way the two instruments were connected:
The keys of communication with the harpsichord, at which Mr. Bates, the conductor, was seated, extended nineteen feet from the body of the organ, and twenty feet seven inches below the perpendicular of the set of keys by which it is usually played … to convey them to so great a distance from the instrument, without rendering the touch impractically heavy, required uncommon ingenuity and mechanical resources.

It was made by Samuel Green of Islington for Canterbury Cathedral. After the instrument was removed to Canterbury it was erected on the choir screen, and remained at Canterbury for over a century before it was replaced by the current Willis instrument.

Given the large specification of the Green organ, and the size of the orchestra that was employed for the performances at Westminster Abbey, it may be logical to suggest that the harpsichord’s only real use in the ensemble was as a remote console for the organ rather than as a timbre in its own right. Charles Burney does suggest that Handel had used a similar device before.

References

Sources
New Grove Dictionary of Music, online edition [available (with subscription) at <http://www.grovemusic.com>]
Wilson Barry (1990) ‘The Lodewyk Theewes Claviorganum and its Position in the History of Keyboard Instruments’, Journal of the American Musical Instrument Society, xvi (1990), pp. 5–41.

External links

Extant claviorgan at The Metropolitan Museum of Art
 Claviorgan by Laurentius Hauslaib, 1598, Nuremberg
 Claviorgan by Herman Willenbrock, Hannover, Germany, 1712
Claviorgan by Laurentius Hauslaib, Nuremberg, 1590 ca.

Pipe organ
Harpsichord
Keyboard instruments